Law Chun Bong (born 25 January 1981 in Hong Kong), is a former Hong Kong professional football player. He can play in many positions (forward, left winger, left midfielder and left wing back), mostly as a left midfielder. He is a pacey, and has good finishing (both head and feet), as well as a sense of sight. These elements have enabled him to create many chances for the team.

He started to make his name in fame when he performed sharply in the East Asian Cup 2003. He and Wong Chun Yue is publicly named by the former Japan coach Zico as one of the most promising midfielders in years.

Childhood and early career
Back to the time when Law was around 8-years-old, his father brought him to take part in a Summer Holiday football training programme. Since that time, he has found himself fancy with football and improved greatly with his knowledge of this sport.

In Law's high school times, he was discovered because of promising performances in the high school competitions. Then he joined the Hong Kong juniors. Because of his professionalism, impressive attitude and diligence, he was introduced to a Hong Kong First Division League club by a coach when he was 19. And there he started his profession as a footballer.

Honours

Club
Sun Hei
 Hong Kong First Division League: 2003–04
 Hong Kong League Cup: 2002–03, 2003–04
 Hong Kong FA Cup: 2002–03

Happy Valley
 Hong Kong First Division League: 2005–06

Citizen
 Hong Kong Senior Challenge Shield: 2010–11

Career statistics

Club
As of 17 August 2006

International goals
Scores and results list Hong Kong's goal tally first.

References

External links
Law Chun Bong at HKFA
Law Chun Bong's profile at hvaaclub.com
 

1981 births
Living people
Hong Kong footballers
Hong Kong international footballers
Association football midfielders
South China AA players
Citizen AA players
Happy Valley AA players
Hong Kong Rangers FC players
Sun Hei SC players
Yee Hope players
Hong Kong First Division League players
Hong Kong Premier League players
Yokohama FC Hong Kong players
Footballers at the 2002 Asian Games
Asian Games competitors for Hong Kong
Hong Kong League XI representative players